Arthrophytum is a genus of flowering plants belonging to the family Amaranthaceae.

Its native range is Central Asia.

Species:

Arthrophytum balchaschense 
Arthrophytum betpakdalense 
Arthrophytum iliense 
Arthrophytum korovinii 
Arthrophytum lehmannianum 
Arthrophytum longibracteatum 
Arthrophytum pulvinatum 
Arthrophytum subulifolium

References

Amaranthaceae
Amaranthaceae genera
Taxa named by Alexander von Schrenk